Gyrinomimus is a genus of flabby whalefishes.

Species
There are currently five recognized species in this genus:
 Gyrinomimus andriashevi Fedorov, Balushkin & Trunov, 1987
 Gyrinomimus bruuni Rofen, 1959
 Gyrinomimus grahami L. R. Richardson & Garrick, 1964
 Gyrinomimus myersi A. E. Parr, 1934
 Gyrinomimus parri Bigelow, 1961 (Parr's combtooth whalefish)

References

Cetomimiformes
Taxa named by Albert Eide Parr
Marine fish genera